Urspelt is a locality in the commune of Clervaux, in northern Luxembourg.  , the village has a population of 96.

Urspelt Castle has a history going back at least three centuries but today's building dates from 1860. After comprehensive restoration work and additions, it recently opened as a hotel and meeting centre.

References

Clervaux
Villages in Luxembourg